Ahmed Darwish [أحمد فرج درويش in Arabic] (born 29 October 1984) is a Saudi football player. He currently plays for Al Ahli.

Honours

Al-Ahli (Jeddah)
Saudi Crown Prince Cup: 2007
Gulf Club Champions Cup: 2008
Saudi Champions Cup: 2011, 2012

National Team
2007 AFC Asian Cup: Runner-up

References

Saudi Arabian footballers
1984 births
Living people
Al-Ahli Saudi FC players
2007 AFC Asian Cup players
Sportspeople from Jeddah
Saudi Professional League players
Association football midfielders
Saudi Arabia international footballers